Athletics competitions at the 1966 South Pacific Games were held in Nouméa, New Caledonia, between 10 and 13 December 1966.

A total of 31 events were contested, 20 by men and 11 by women.

Medal summary
Medal winners and their results were published on the Athletics Weekly webpage
courtesy of Tony Isaacs and Børre Lilloe, and on the Oceania Athletics Association webpage by Bob Snow.

Complete results can also be found on the Oceania Athletics Association webpage by Bob Snow.

Men

Women

Medal table (unofficial)

Participation (unofficial)
Athletes from 13 countries were reported to participate:

 British Solomon Islands
 Cook Islands
 
 
 
 
 Nauru
 

 Papua and New Guinea

References

External links
Pacific Games Council
Oceania Athletics Association

Athletics at the Pacific Games
Athletics in New Caledonia
South Pacific Games
1966 in New Caledonia
1966 Pacific Games